Wonder Boys is a 2000 comedy-drama film directed by Curtis Hanson and written by Steve Kloves. An international co-production between the United States, the United Kingdom, Germany, and Japan, it is based on the 1995 novel of the same name by Michael Chabon. Michael Douglas stars as professor Grady Tripp, a novelist who teaches creative writing at a university but has been unable to finish his second novel.

The film was shot in Pittsburgh, Pennsylvania, including locations at Carnegie Mellon University, Chatham University, University of Pittsburgh, and Shady Side Academy. Other Pennsylvania locations included Beaver, Rochester and Rostraver Township. After the film failed at the box office, there was a second attempt to find an audience with a new marketing campaign and a November 8, 2000, re-release, which was also a financial disappointment. Despite this, the film received three Academy Award nominations at the 73rd Academy Awards, including Best Adapted Screenplay, winning Best Original Song for Bob Dylan's "Things Have Changed".

Plot
Professor Grady Tripp is a novelist who teaches creative writing at an unnamed Pennsylvania university. He is having an affair with the university chancellor, Sara Gaskell, whose husband, Walter, is the chairman of the English department in which Grady is a professor. Grady's third wife, Emily, has just left him, and he has failed to repeat the grand success of his first novel, published years earlier. He continues to labor on a second novel, but the more he tries to finish it the less able he finds himself to invent a satisfactory ending. The book runs to over 2500 pages and is still far from finished. He spends his free time smoking cannabis.

Grady's students include James Leer and Hannah Green. Hannah and James are friends and both very good writers. Hannah, who rents a room in Grady's large house, is attracted to Grady, but he does not reciprocate. James is enigmatic, quiet, dark and enjoys writing fiction more than he first lets on.

During a party at the Gaskells' house, Sara reveals to Grady that she is pregnant with his child. Grady finds James standing outside holding what he claims to be a replica gun, won by his mother at a fairground during her schooldays. However, the gun turns out to be very real, as James shoots the Gaskells' dog when he finds it attacking Grady. James also steals a very valuable piece of Marilyn Monroe memorabilia from the house. Grady is unable to tell Sara of this incident as she is pressuring him to choose between her and Emily. As a result, Grady is forced to keep the dead dog in the trunk of his car for most of the weekend. He also allows James to follow him around, fearing that he may be depressed or even suicidal. Gradually, he realizes that much of what James tells him about himself and his life is untrue, seemingly designed to elicit Grady's sympathy.

Meanwhile, Grady's editor, Terry Crabtree, has flown into town on the pretense of attending the university's annual WordFest, a literary event for aspiring authors. In reality, Terry is there to see if Grady has written anything worth publishing, as both men's careers depend on Grady's upcoming book. Terry arrives with a date whom he met on the flight, a transvestite called Antonia Sloviak. The pair become intimate in a bedroom at the Gaskells' party, but immediately afterward, Terry meets James and becomes infatuated with him, and Antonia is unceremoniously sent home. After a night on the town, Terry and James semi-consciously flirt throughout the night, which eventually leads up to the two spending an intimate night together in one of Grady's spare rooms.

Tired and confused, Grady phones Walter and reveals to him that he is in love with Sara. Meanwhile, Walter has also made the connection between the disappearance of the Marilyn Monroe memorabilia and James. The following morning the police arrive with Sara to escort James to the Chancellor's office to discuss the ramifications of his actions. The memorabilia is still in Grady's car, which has conspicuously gone missing. The car had been given to him by a friend as payment for a loan, and, over the weekend, Grady has come to suspect that the car was stolen. Throughout his travel around town, a man claiming to be the car's real owner repeatedly accosted Grady. He eventually tracks the car down, but in a dispute over its ownership, the majority of his manuscript blows out of the car and is lost. The car's owner gives him a ride to the university with his wife Oola in the passenger seat, along with the stolen memorabilia.

Grady finally sees that making things right involves having to make difficult choices. Grady tells the story behind the memorabilia and allows Oola to leave with it. Worried that Grady's choice comes at the expense of damaging James's future, Terry convinces Walter not to press charges by agreeing to publish his book about Joe DiMaggio and Marilyn Monroe.

Grady recounts the fate of the main characters: Hannah graduates and becomes a junior editor, James drops out and moves to New York to rework his novel for publication, and Terry "goes right on being Crabtree." Grady finishes typing his new booknow saved on a computerwhich is an account of the recent events, then watches as Sara and their child arrive home.

Cast

 Michael Douglas as Professor Grady Tripp
 Tobey Maguire as James Leer
 Frances McDormand as Chancellor Sara Gaskell
 Katie Holmes as Hannah Green
 Rip Torn as Quentin "Q" Morewood
 Robert Downey Jr. as Terry Crabtree
 Richard Thomas as Walter Gaskell
 Richard Knox as Vernon Hardapple
 Jane Adams as Oola
 Alan Tudyk as Sam Traxler
 George Grizzard as Fred Leer
 Kelly Bishop as Amanda Leer
 Philip Bosco as Emily's father
 Michael Cavadias as Miss Antonia "Tony" Sloviak

Production

Development
After L.A. Confidential, Curtis Hanson was working on a screenplay of his own and reading other scripts with a keen interest for his next film. Actress Elizabeth McGovern advised Hanson to work with screenwriter Steve Kloves. When he was given the writer's script for Wonder Boys and was told that Michael Douglas was interested in starring, he "fell in love with these characters – and they made me laugh." Hanson also identified with Grady Tripp and the "thing building up inside him: frustration, hunger, yearning, et cetera."

Screenplay
Kloves, best known for writing and directing The Fabulous Baker Boys, returned to the film business after a self-imposed seven-year retirement to adapt Michael Chabon's novel for the money and also because he identified with Grady. He was originally going to direct the film as well but bowed out and Hanson came on board. Kloves had never adapted a novel before but was encouraged by Chabon to make the material his own. Additional changes were made once Hanson came on board. For example, he felt that James Leer would be a fan of Douglas Sirk's films as opposed to Frank Capra as he is in the novel.

Casting
Paramount was not interested in making a quirky, character-driven comedy drama until Douglas agreed to work well below his usual large fee. The actor gained 25 pounds for the film by consuming pizza, subs, and beer. One of the challenges for Hanson was to take a plot that, as he put it, "is meandering and, apparently, sort of aimless," and a character that "does things that even he doesn't really know why he's doing them," and try to create a "feeling of focus" to keep the audience interested. Another challenge the director faced was working in actual locations in very cold weather that was constantly changing.

Robert Downey Jr. was on probation during the winter of 1999 when Hanson considered him for a role in Wonder Boys. Hanson was cautious because of the actor's drug history and concerned because it would be a tough film shot in sequence in Pittsburgh in the winter. Downey flew to Pittsburgh and had a long dinner conversation with Hanson where they addressed his problems. The actor demonstrated a commitment to the project and Hanson hired him. Reportedly, Downey acted professionally for the entire four-and-a-half month shoot, but after it ended, he returned to Los Angeles and violated his parole.

In an interview with Marc Maron, actor Rob McElhenney stated that he was initially cast in a minor role as Holmes' love interest, but was informed by Hanson that he would be cut out of the film during post-production.

Filming
Paramount suggested shooting Wonder Boys in Toronto or New York City but after reading the book, Hanson realized how important Pittsburgh was to the story, that it was a "wonder boy," much like the film's main protagonist Grady Tripp, "it's a city that had this glorious past of wealth and success that ended. And then it had to deal with figuring out what's next. What happens after triumph?" Wonder Boys was filmed in Pittsburgh, including locations at Carnegie Mellon University, Chatham College, and Shady Side Academy. Other Pennsylvania locations included Beaver, Rochester, and Rostraver Township. Hanson felt that Pittsburgh was "right, emotionally and thematically" for the film. The city was experiencing a mild winter during the film's shoot and they had to use a lot of artificial snow.

Hanson contacted Dante Spinotti about working on the film in November 1998. They had worked previously together on L.A. Confidential. Spinotti had six weeks of pre-production, which he used to perform a variety of tests and shoot a number of important background plates for several scenes that take place at night, in cars. He knew that these scenes included some very critical acting and suggested using the green screen process for greater control. During pre-production, Hanson and Spinotti used the Kodak Pre View System to storyboard complicated sequences by altering digital still images in a way that simulated the imaging characteristics of camera films. Hanson suggested Spinotti see The Celebration for its technique of keeping the camera extremely close to the actors and carrying deep focus from one actor to the other. Spinotti suggested using a hand-held camera so that the film would not look static. On the first day of shooting, they incorporated some hand-held shots. Hanson liked the results and they used the technique extensively for the rest of the shoot.

Soundtrack

Hanson had been a fan of Bob Dylan's music since childhood and a great admirer of his soundtrack for Pat Garrett and Billy the Kid. Dylan admired Hanson's previous film, L.A. Confidential and after much convincing, screened 90 minutes of rough footage from Wonder Boys. Hanson picked Dylan because, as he said, "Who knows more about being a Wonder Boy and the trap it can be, about the expectations and the fear of repeating yourself?"

In addition to Dylan, Hanson built the score around nine singer-songwriters including Leonard Cohen and Neil Young. The entire soundtrack is integrated into the film with Hanson playing some of the songs for the actors on the Pittsburgh set to convey a scene's "aural texture," as he put it. The soundtrack features several songs by Bob Dylan, including one new composition, "Things Have Changed," which would win the Academy Award for Best Original Song. Hanson also created a music video for the song, filming new footage of Bob Dylan on the film's various locations and editing it with footage used in Wonder Boys as if Dylan were actually in the film. According to Hanson, "Every song reflects the movie's themes of searching for past promise, future success and a sense of purpose."

 "Things Have Changed" - Bob Dylan (5:10)
 "A Child's Claim to Fame" - Buffalo Springfield (2:12)
 "No Regrets" - Tom Rush (3:52)
 "Old Man" - Neil Young (3:23)
 "Shooting Star" - Bob Dylan (3:09)
 "Reason to Believe" – Tim Hardin (2:00)
 "Need Your Love So Bad" - Little Willie John (2:17)
 "Not Dark Yet" - Bob Dylan (6:30)
 "Slip Away" - Clarence Carter (2:32)
 "Waiting for the Miracle" - Leonard Cohen (7:43)
 "Buckets of Rain" - Bob Dylan (3:23)
 "Watching the Wheels" - John Lennon (3:32)
 "Philosophers Stone" - Van Morrison (6:03)

Reception

Box office
In its opening weekend, Wonder Boys opened at No. 7 in the US and Canadian box office and grossed a total of US$5.8 million in 1,253 theaters. It went on to gross $19,393,557 there and $14,033,031 in other countries, for a worldwide total of $33,426,588. Based on a $55 million budget, the film was a box office bomb.

Critical response
The film received largely positive reviews from critics. Rotten Tomatoes reports an 81% "Fresh" rating, based on 125 reviews, with an average rating of 7.2/10. The site's consensus states: "Michael Douglas and Tobey Maguire do wonders in this clever dark comedy." On Metacritic, the film has a 73 out of 100 score, based on 36 critics, indicating "generally favorable reviews". Audiences polled by CinemaScore gave the film an average grade of "C" on an A+ to F scale.

In a four-star review, Roger Ebert, film critic of the Chicago Sun-Times, praised Wonder Boys as "the most accurate movie about campus life that I can remember. It is accurate, not because it captures intellectual debate or campus politics, but because it knows two things: (1) Students come and go, but the faculty actually lives there, and (2) many faculty members stay stuck in graduate-student mode for decades". Emanuel Levy of Variety wrote, "The movie's frivolous touches and eccentric details emphasize its dry, measured wit and the power of comedy to underscore serious ideas. Massively inventive, Wonder Boys is spiked with fresh, perverse humor that flows naturally from the straight-faced playing". A.O. Scott from The New York Times wrote, "The problem is that everyone involved seems to have agreed that it was a great idea for a movie and pretty much left it at that".

In his review for Time, Richard Corliss wrote, "Wonder Boys reminds us of a distant age (the '70s) when bad movies were better: not stupid teen romps but sad, off-kilter studies of adults adrift. It is a rare current example of that endangered species, the honorable failure". Entertainment Weekly gave the film a "C+" rating and Owen Gleiberman wrote, "Curtis Hanson may have wanted to make a movie that gleamed with humanity as much as L.A. Confidential burned with malevolence, but he's so intent on getting us to like his characters that he didn't give them enough juice." Looking back in his Salon.com review, critic Andrew O'Hehir felt that Hanson, "and cinematographer Dante Spinotti capture both Pittsburgh (one of the most serendipitously beautiful American cities) and the netherworld of boho academia with brilliant precision. If you went to a liberal-arts college anywhere in the United States, then the way Grady's ramshackle house looks in the wake of Crabs' enormous all-night party should conjure up vivid sense-memories".

Re-release

Many critics blamed Paramount's initial ad campaign for the film not finding a mainstream audience. The Wall Street Journal's Joe Morgenstern praised Douglas' work in the film, but criticized the poster, which featured a headshot of Douglas: "a raffishly eccentric role, and he's never been so appealing. (Don't be put off by the movie's cryptic poster, which makes him look like Michael J. Pollard.)" The Los Angeles Times''' Kenneth Turan also slammed the poster: "The film's ad poster brings Elmer Fudd to mind." Hanson said that the poster made Douglas look "like he was trying to be Robin Williams". In an interview with Amy Taubin, Hanson said, "The very things that made Michael and I want to do the movie so badly were the reasons it was so tricky to market. Since films go out on so many screens at once, there's a need for instant appeal. But Wonder Boys isn't easily reducible to a single image or a catchy ad line".

Hanson felt that the studio played it safe with the original ad campaign. They also released it a week after the Academy Award nominations were announced and the studio spent more money promoting the films of theirs that were nominated and not enough on Wonder Boys. The studio pulled the film out of theaters and quickly canceled the video release. Hanson and the film's producer Scott Rudin lobbied to have it re-released. They designed a new campaign  including posters and a trailer for the re-release that emphasized the ensemble cast.

Home mediaWonder Boys'' was released on VHS and DVD by Paramount Home Video in North America, Warner Home Video in international territories, except the United Kingdom and Universal Pictures Video and Vision Video in the United Kingdom in 2001.

Accolades

Notes

References

External links

 
 
 
 

2000 films
2000 comedy-drama films
2000 LGBT-related films
2000s English-language films
Adultery in films
American comedy-drama films
American LGBT-related films
BBC Film films
Bisexuality-related films
British comedy-drama films
British LGBT-related films
English-language German films
English-language Japanese films
Fictional portrayals of the Pittsburgh Bureau of Police
Films about educators
Films about writers
Films based on American novels
Films directed by Curtis Hanson
Films produced by Scott Rudin
Films scored by Christopher Young
Films set in Pennsylvania
Films set in Pittsburgh
Films set in universities and colleges
Films shot in Pittsburgh
Films that won the Best Original Song Academy Award
Films with screenplays by Steve Kloves
Gay-related films
German comedy-drama films
German LGBT-related films
Japanese comedy-drama films
Japanese LGBT-related films
LGBT-related comedy-drama films
Mutual Film Company films
Paramount Pictures films
Transgender-related films
Warner Bros. films
2000s American films
2000s British films
2000s Japanese films
2000s German films